In lead climbing using a dynamic rope, the fall factor (f) is the ratio of the height (h) a climber falls before the climber's rope begins to stretch and the rope length (L) available to absorb the energy of the fall,

It is the main factor determining the violence of the forces acting on the climber and the gear.

As a numerical example, consider a fall of 20 feet that occurs with 10 feet of rope out (i.e., the climber has placed no protection and falls from 10 feet above the belayer to 10 feet below—a factor 2 fall). This fall produces far more force on the climber and the gear than if a similar 20 foot fall had occurred 100 feet above the belayer. In the latter case (a fall factor of 0.2), the rope acts like a bigger, longer rubber band, and its stretch more effectively cushions the fall.

Sizes of fall factors 

The smallest possible fall factor is  zero. This occurs, for example, in top-rope a fall onto a rope with no slack. The rope stretches, so although h=0, there is a fall.

When climbing from the ground up, the maximum possible fall factor is 1, since any greater fall would mean that the climber hit the ground.

In multipitch climbing, or in any climb that starts from a position such as an exposed ledge, a fall factor in lead climbing can be as high as 2. This can occur only when a lead climber who has placed no protection falls past the belayer (two times the distance of the rope length between them), or the anchor if the climber is solo climbing the route using a self-belay. As soon as the climber clips the rope into protection above the belay, the fall factor drops below 2.

In falls occurring on a via ferrata, fall factors can be much higher. This is possible because the length of rope between harness and carabiner is short and fixed, while the distance the climber can fall depends on the gaps between anchor points of the safety cable.

Derivation and impact force

The impact force is defined as the maximum tension in the rope when a climber falls. We first state an equation for this quantity and describe its interpretation, and then show its derivation and how it can be put into a more convenient form.

Equation for the impact force and its interpretation

When modeling the rope as an undamped harmonic oscillator (HO) the impact force Fmax in the rope is given by:

where mg is the climber's weight, h is the fall height and k is the spring constant of the portion of the rope that is in play.

We will see below that when varying the height of the fall while keeping the fall factor fixed, the quantity hk stays constant.

There are two factors of two involved in the interpretation of this equation. First, the maximum force on the top piece of protection is roughly 2Fmax, since the gear acts as a simple pulley. Second, it may seem strange that even when f=0, we have  Fmax=2mg (so that the maximum force on the top piece is approximately 4mg). This is because a factor-zero fall is still a fall onto a slack rope. The average value of the tension over a full cycle of harmonic oscillation will be mg, so that the tension will cycle between 0 and 2mg.

Derivation of the equation

Conservation of energy at rope's maximum elongation xmax gives

The maximum force on the climber is Fmax-mg. It is convenient to express things in terms of the elastic modulus E = k L/q which is a property of the material that the rope is constructed from. Here L is the rope's length and q its cross-sectional area. Solution of the quadratic gives

Other than fixed properties of the system, this form of the equation shows that the impact force depends only on the fall factor.

Using the HO model to obtain the impact force of real climbing ropes as a function of fall height h and climber's weight mg, one must know the experimental value for E of a given rope. However, rope manufacturers give only the rope’s impact force F0 and its static and dynamic elongations that are measured under standard UIAA fall conditions: A fall height h0 of 2 × 2.3 m with an available rope length L0 = 2.6m leads to a fall factor f0 = h0/L0 = 1.77 and a fall velocity v0 = (2gh0)1/2 = 9.5 m/s at the end of falling the distance h0. The mass m0 used in the fall is 80 kg. Using these values to eliminate the unknown quantity E leads to an expression of the impact force as a function of arbitrary fall heights h, arbitrary fall factors f, and arbitrary gravity g of the form:

Note that keeping g0 from the derivation of "Eq" based on UIAA test into the above Fmax formula assures that the transformation will continue to be valid for different gravity fields, as over a slope making less than 90 degrees with the horizontal. This simple undamped harmonic oscillator model of a rope, however, does not correctly describe the entire fall process of real ropes. Accurate measurements on the behaviour of a climbing rope during the entire fall can be explained if the undamped harmonic oscillator is complemented by a non-linear term up to the maximum impact force, and then, near the maximum force in the rope, internal friction in the rope is added that ensures the rapid relaxation of the rope to its rest position.

Effect of friction

When the rope is clipped into several carabiners between the climber and the belayer, an additional type of friction occurs, the so-called dry friction between the rope and particularly the last clipped carabiner. "Dry" friction (i.e., a frictional force that is velocity-independent) leads to an effective rope length smaller than the available length L and thus increases the impact force.

See also
Whipper

References

External links 

Climbing
Mechanics